Ilya Gringolts ( Il′já Aleksándrovič Gringól′c) born 2 July 1982 in Leningrad (now St. Petersburg) is a Russian violinist and composer.

Gringolts studied violin in St. Petersburg with Tatiana Liberova and Jeanna Metallidi.  He then attended the Juilliard School, and studied violin with Itzhak Perlman for 3 years.  From 2001 to 2003, Gringolts was a member of the BBC Radio 3 New Generation Artists programme.

Gringolts is currently on the music faculty of the Zürcher Hochschule der Künste.  In addition to the modern violin, he has a continued commitment to period-instrument performance.  He founded the Gringolts Quartet in 2008 and plays first violin in the quartet.  Gringolts plays the "ex-Kiesewetter" Stradivarius violin, loaned to him by the Stradivari Society of Chicago.

Gringolts has made commercial recordings for such labels as Onyx and Deutsche Grammophon.

Gringolts is married to the Armenian violinist Anahit Kurtikyan.  The couple has two daughters.  His sister Olga is married to Israeli violinist Maxim Vengerov.

Awards and prizes
 1992: All-Russian Junior Competition, Second Prize
 1994: International Youth Competition in St. Petersburg, First Prize
 1995: Yehudi Menuhin International Competition for Young Violinists, Junior Division, Sixth Prize
 1997: Henryk Wieniawski Violin Competition, Junior Division, Laureate
 1998: Paganini Competition in Genoa, Italy: First Prize
 2001-2003: BBC New Generation Artist
 2006: Gramophone Award for Chamber Music, recording of chamber music of the Sergei Taneyev  Piano Quintet with Vadim Repin, Nobuko Imai, Lynn Harrell, and Mikhail Pletnev.

References

External links
 Official Ilya Gringolts web page
 All-Music discography page for Ilya Gringolts
 Medici TV page on Ilya Gringolts
 Prestoclassical page on Gramophone Awards 2006, Record of the Year

1982 births
Paganini Competition prize-winners
Living people
Russian classical violinists
Male classical violinists
BBC Radio 3 New Generation Artists
21st-century classical violinists
21st-century Russian male musicians